Jensen Plowright (born 15 May 2000) is an Australian professional racing cyclist, who currently rides for UCI WorldTeam .

Major results
2017
 3rd Road race, National Junior Road Championships
2018
 1st Stage 1 Tour of the King Valley
2019
 1st Stage 3 New Zealand Cycle Classic
 1st Stage 1 Tour of Southland
 1st Stage 1 Tour of Tasmania
2020
 1st Stage 3 New Zealand Cycle Classic
2021
 1st Melbourne to Warrnambool Classic
 4th Overall A Travers les Hauts de France
2022
 1st Youngster Coast Challenge
 1st Stage 2 Le Triptyque des Monts et Châteaux
 4th Dorpenomloop Rucphen
 9th Grote Prijs Jean-Pierre Monseré

References

External links

2000 births
Living people
Australian male cyclists
Cyclists from Melbourne